Joseph Dave Gomez (born 23 May 1997) is an English professional footballer who plays as a centre-back for  club Liverpool.

Gomez began his career at Charlton Athletic, breaking into the first team at 17 and playing one full season before joining Liverpool in June 2015. After establishing himself as a first-team regular, Gomez struggled with injuries, but appeared in the 2019 UEFA Champions League final as Liverpool won the competition. He played in the final of the 2019 FIFA Club World Cup with Liverpool winning the competition for the first time in the club's history. He was part of the team that won the 2019–20 Premier League, Liverpool's first league title in 30 years.

Gomez has represented England at every level and played every minute of every match when England won the 2014 UEFA European Under-17 Championship. He made his debut for the England senior team in November 2017.

Club career

Charlton Athletic

Gomez was born in Catford, Greater London to a Gambian father and an English mother. He joined the academy at nearby Charlton Athletic at the age of 10, making his debut for the club's under-18 team at just 13 years old. Despite strong interest from other clubs, Gomez signed his first professional contract with Charlton in October 2014. His first-team debut came under manager Bob Peeters in a 4–0 League Cup victory over Colchester United at The Valley on 12 August 2014, playing the full 90 minutes at right-back. A week later he made his league debut in a 3–2 home win against Derby County in the Championship. Gomez went on to make 24 appearances during his first season.

Liverpool

2015–2017

On 20 June 2015, Premier League club Liverpool signed Gomez on a five-year contract for a fee of £3.5 million. He made his debut against Stoke City on 9 August, starting as a left-back in a 1–0 win, assisting Philippe Coutinho's match-winning goal in the 86th minute.

On 13 October 2015, Gomez suffered a season ending anterior cruciate ligament injury while playing for England U21. A full year later, Gomez returned to full first-team training on 13 October 2016. On 13 November, Gomez played 45 minutes in a behind closed doors friendly match at Melwood.

On 8 January 2017, Gomez made his first start since the injury in an FA Cup 0–0 home draw against Plymouth Argyle.

2017–2019
On 23 August 2017, Gomez made his European debut, in a 4–2 win over 1899 Hoffenheim in the UEFA Champions League play-off. Due to the injury of Nathaniel Clyne, Gomez was the first choice right-back for the first half of the season; even starting in games against rivals Arsenal and Manchester United; against the former he assisted the first goal in an eventual 4–0 win, and his performance against the latter received praise from fans.

In late March 2018, it was confirmed that Gomez would miss the next few games as a result of suffering an injury during an international friendly game. In May 2018, Gomez underwent surgery to his ankle injury, with Liverpool confirming via their official website that Gomez wouldn't play in Liverpool's last fixtures of the season, including the 2018 Champions League final. Overall, Gomez made 31 appearances across the season for Liverpool.

As a result of the lack of fitness of regular first-team defenders Dejan Lovren and Joël Matip, Gomez was able to establish himself as first-choice centre-back in Liverpool's first games of the season alongside Virgil van Dijk, receiving praise for his performances and receiving the man of the match for his performance in a 2–1 win over Leicester City on 1 September. He continued to feature in defence for the club during the opening half of the season before suffering a fractured leg in December following a challenge by Burnley defender Ben Mee. In February of the following year, he underwent surgery in an attempt to assist his recovery from the injury. Regaining fitness in April, Gomez made a substitute appearance for Liverpool in the 2019 Champions League final, which the club won.

2019–2022
Gomez began the next season deputising for the in-form Joël Matip, who had become a mainstay alongside Virgil van Dijk during Gomez's injury layoff the previous season. Gomez found himself recalled to the starting line-up following injury problems for Matip, and earned praise after a slew of clean sheets in the winter months as Liverpool extended a significant lead at the top of the Premier League table. Gomez was singled out for praise for his leadership and composure during a 1–0 victory over rivals Everton in the FA Cup in January; a match in which Gomez was the only senior player in the back-line after James Milner's early departure.

Gomez suffered a tendon injury to his left knee whilst away on international duty with England and underwent successful surgery on 11 November 2020 to correct the damage. This left Liverpool with an injury crisis at the centre of their defence, following the ACL injury of Gomez' centre-back partner Virgil van Dijk. FIFA agreed to pay Liverpool £2 million in compensation to cover Gomez's wages whilst he was injured.

In May 2022, Gomez was an unused substitute in the final as Liverpool won the 2021–22 FA Cup. He was also on the bench as they lost 1–0 to Real Madrid in the 2022 Champions League final.

2022–present
On 7 July 2022, he signed a new five-year contract with the club. On 9 November 2022, he captained Liverpool in the win against Derby County in the third round of the 2022–23 EFL Cup at Anfield.

International career

Gomez has been capped by England at under-16, under-17 and under-19 levels. In May 2014, he was part of the squad that won the 2014 UEFA European Under-17 Championship in Malta, playing every minute of England's five matches and being named in UEFA's team of the tournament. Through his father he could have been eligible to play for Gambia.

On 25 August 2015, he received his first call-up to the under-21 squad. On 30 August 2017, Gomez was announced as England U21 captain ahead of the qualifying campaign for the 2019 UEFA European Under-21 Championship.

He received his first call-up to the England senior squad in November 2017. He made his England debut against Germany at Wembley Stadium in a friendly match, coming on as a substitute to replace Phil Jones in a 0–0 draw. Gomez received a man of the match award in the following game for his performance against Brazil, earning praise for a number of crucial interceptions, and for his ability to nullify the threat of Neymar.

Style of play
Gomez prefers to play as a centre-back but can also play as a full back on either side. He has been described as a complete footballer and composed ball-playing centre-back with his style of play, being compared to that of Rio Ferdinand whom he idolised growing up. Gomez is also noted for his athleticism, pace and strength; he is able to produce powerful and dangerous runs up-field on the counter-attack and in defence is rarely physically dominated by an opponent.

Personal life
Gomez met his partner, Tamara, in 2014, on a bus on his way to school. They live together in Cheshire and have a son. His cousin Muhammadu Faal is also a footballer.

Career statistics

Club

International

Honours
Liverpool
Premier League: 2019–20
FA Cup: 2021–22
FA Community Shield: 2022
UEFA Champions League: 2018–19, runner-up: 2021–22
UEFA Super Cup: 2019
FIFA Club World Cup: 2019

England U17
UEFA European Under-17 Championship: 2014

England
UEFA Nations League third place: 2018–19

Individual
UEFA European Under-17 Championship Team of the Tournament: 2014

References

External links

Profile at the Liverpool F.C. website

1997 births
Living people
Footballers from Catford
English footballers
Association football defenders
Charlton Athletic F.C. players
Liverpool F.C. players
English Football League players
Premier League players
UEFA Champions League winning players
England youth international footballers
England under-21 international footballers
England international footballers
Black British sportsmen
English people of Gambian descent